Paltin is a commune located in Vrancea County, Romania. It is composed of five villages: Ghebari, Paltin, Prahuda, Țepa and Vâlcani. It included seven other villages until 2005, when they were split off to form Spulber Commune.

References

Communes in Vrancea County
Localities in Western Moldavia